Rena humilis, known commonly as the western blind snake, the western slender blind snake, or the western threadsnake, is a species of snake in the family Leptotyphlopidae. The species is endemic to the southwestern United States and northern Mexico. Six subspecies are currently recognized, including the nominate subspecies described here.

Description

Rena humilis, like most species in the family Leptotyphlopidae, resembles a long earthworm. It lives underground in burrows, and since it has no use for vision, its eyes are mostly vestigial. The western blind snake is pink, purple, or silvery-brown in color, shiny, wormlike, cylindrical, blunt at both ends, and has light-detecting black eyespots. The skull is thick to permit burrowing, and it has a spine at the end of its tail that it uses for leverage. This species and other blind snakes are fluorescent under low frequency ultraviolet light (black light).

On the top of the head, between the ocular scales, L. humilis has only one scale (L. dulcis has three scales).

Common names
Common names for R. humilis include western slender blind snake, western threadsnake, and western blind snake.

Geographic range
R. humilis is found in the southwestern United States and northern Mexico. In the US it ranges from southwestern and Trans-Pecos Texas west through southern and central Arizona, southern Nevada, southwestern Utah, and southern California. In Mexico its distribution includes the Mexican states of Baja California, Sonora, Sinaloa, Nayarit, Jalisco, Colima, Chihuahua, Durango, Coahuila, Tamaulipas, and San Luis Potosí.

The type locality given is "Valliecitas, Cal." The type locality was restricted by Klauber (1931) to "vicinity of Vallecito, eastern San Diego County, California," and by Brattstrom (1953) to "the Upper Sonoran Life Zone of the Vallecito area".

Habitat and diet
Its diet is made up mostly of insects and their larvae and eggs. It is found in deserts and scrub where the soil is loose enough to work.

Subspecies

References

Further reading
Adalsteinsson SA, Branch WR, Trape S, Vitt LJ, Hedges SB (2009). "Molecular phylogeny, classification, and biogeography of snakes of the Family Leptotyphlopidae (Reptilia, Squamata)". Zootaxa 2244: 1-50.
Baird SF, Girard CF (1853). Catalogue of North American Reptiles in the Museum of the Smithsonian Institution. Part I.—Serpents. Washington, District of Columbia: Smithsonian Institution. xvi + 172 pp. (Rena humilis, new species, p. 143).
Behler JL, King FW (1979). The Audubon Society Field Guide to North American Reptiles and Amphibians. New York: Alfred A. Knopf. 743 pp. . (Leptotyphlops humilis, pp. 584–585 + Plate 457).
Boulenger GA (1893). Catalogue of the Snakes in the British Museum (Natural HIstory). Volume I., Containing the Families Typhlopidæ, Glauconiidæ... London: Trustees of the British Museum (Natural History). (Taylor and Francis, printers). xiii + 448 pp. + Plates I-XXVIII. (Glauconia humilis, pp. 70–71).
Conant R (1975). A Field Guide to Reptiles and Amphibians of Eastern and Central North America, Second Edition. Boston: Houghton Mifflin. xviii + 429 pp.  (hardcover),  (paperback). (Leptotyphlops humilis, pp. 137–138, Figure 31 + Map 121).
Klauber LM (1940). "The Worm Snakes of the Genus Leptotyphlops in the United States and northern Mexico". Trans. San Diego Soc. Nat. Hist. 9: 87-162.
Powell R, Conant R, Collins JT (2016). Peterson Field Guide to Reptiles and Amphibians of Eastern and Central North America, Fourth Edition. Boston and New York: Houghton Mifflin Harcourt. xiv + 494 pp., 47 plates, 207 figures. . (Rena humilis, pp. 361–363, Figure 172).
Schmidt KP, Davis DD (1941). Field Book of Snakes of the United States and Canada. New York: G.P. Putnam's Sons. 365 pp. (Leptotyphlops humilis, pp. 94–95).
Stebbins RC (2003). A Field Guide to Western Reptiles and Amphibians, Third Edition. The Peterson Field Guide Series ®. Boston & New York: Houghton Mifflin. xiii + 533 pp. . (Leptotyphlops humilis, pp. 340–341 + Plate 42 + Map 128).
Stejneger L, Barbour T (1917). A Check List of North American Amphibians and Reptiles. Cambridge, Massachusetts: Harvard University Press. 125 pp. (Siagonodon humilis, p. 73).
Wright AH, Wright AA (1957). Handbook of Snakes of the United States and Canada. Ithaca and London: Comstock Publishing Associates, a division of Cornell University Press. 1,105 pp. (in 2 volumes). (Leptotyphlops humilis, pp. 43–50, Figure 12 + Map 7 on p. 39).

External links

iNaturalist page

humilis
Reptiles of the United States
Reptiles of Mexico
Taxa named by Charles Frédéric Girard
Taxa named by Spencer Fullerton Baird
Reptiles described in 1853